Football Club Nordsjælland, commonly known as FC Nordsjælland, Nordsjælland or FCN, is a professional Danish football team from the North Zealand town of Farum. Founded as Farum Boldklub from the merger of the town's two football clubs Farum IK and Stavnsholt BK in 1991, the club changed its name to FC Nordsjælland in 2003.

FCN plays in the Danish Superliga, winning its first medal in the 2002–03 season, taking third place. Since then, the Wild Tigers have made four appearances in Europe under both the old UEFA Cup format in 2003–04, 2008–09 and in the UEFA Europa League during the 2010–11 and 2011–12 seasons. In 2010, the club won its first Danish Cup and successfully defended it the following year in 2011, beating Midtjylland in both finals. FCN won the 2011–12 Danish Superliga in May 2012 which qualified the team to participate in the 2012–13 UEFA Champions League.

Nordsjælland plays its home matches at Right to Dream Park, which has a capacity of 10,100 of which 9,800 seating and 300 standing spectators.

History

Farum BK (1991–2003)
Established on 1 January 1991 from the merger of two football clubs, Farum Idræts Klub (formed in 1910) and Stavnsholt Boldklub af 1974, both from the former Farum municipality (now consolidated with Værløse as the Furesø municipality), Farum BK would become one of the few successful mergers in Danish football, but not without controversy. The club was an initiative of Farum residents including mayor Peter Brixtofte, who took a personal interest in the club by arranging sponsorship. The club kit colours became a combination of the two merged clubs, the red and white of Stavnsholt with the yellow and blue of F.I.K. combined into a kit with yellow and red striped shirts and dark blue shorts and socks, which is still used in some form to this day. Colours were not the only thing the newly formed club inherited, as Thomas Andreasen who had been with Stavnsholt BK was carried over into the new Farum squad, Andreasen would go on to make a record 295 appearances, playing from the Denmark Series all the way to the Danish Superliga, until his departure from the club in 2007.

Farum BK was placed in the second group of the Denmark Series, the fourth tier in the Danish football pyramid, though it gained promotion to the first group after the club's maiden season. Jørgen Andersen, a former goalkeeper for Hvidovre, took over as the club's first head coach in 1992. The club stayed in the Denmark Series first group for six years. Under the guidance of manager Jørgen Tideman, who took over in 1994, Farum qualified for promotion into the 2nd Division in the 1997–98 season and subsequently turned professional for the first time in club history.

Farum's first full season as a professional club was a fruitful one, edging out Aalborg Chang and Skive by one point, gaining promotion for the second time in two years into the 1st Division. The club's meteoric rise was slowed at first with the new challenge of playing in the Danish second tier, though it was not stopped, ending the 1999–2000 campaign with a respectable eighth-place finish, winning the same number of games as it lost. Farum, however, remained unable to make any sort of impact in the Danish Cup, having lost in the first round for the previous three years since making its debut in the tournament in the 1997–98 season. The following year saw some progression in both the league and cup, improving on the previous year's finish by finishing fifth, three spots and nine points behind second-placed promotion winners Vejle, as well as breaking out of the first round of the Danish Cup to eventually fall to Fremad Amager in the third round following a 2–1 loss.

With the 2001–02 season, unconventional coach Christian Andersen was brought in to manage the team, building on the foothold the club had gained in the 1st Division. Jeppe Tengbjerg played a pivotal role, brought in from B.93 the previous year. He scored 16 goals, becoming Farum's top goalscorer of the season and third overall in the league. The team went on to earn promotion into the Superliga after finishing in second place, 11 points clear of third-placed Sønderjylland, one point behind first-place winners Køge, scoring a team total of 69 goals, the highest in the division that season, and losing only four games.

Farum's 2002–03 appearance in the top flight of Danish football would be its first and last under the Farum BK name. It ended the season in third place, qualifying for the UEFA Cup for the first time in its history. The club's achievement, however, was overshadowed by the scandal involving Peter Brixtofte, who had arranged for the municipality to deliberately overpay for welfare services bought from private companies that in return would sponsor the Farum football team. Brixtofte was forced to step down as chairman and the club came close to bankruptcy.

FC Nordsjælland (2003–present)

In March 2003, Farum BK was bought by AKP Holding, the holdings company of local businessman Allan K. Pedersen, and in an effort to distance the club from the Brixtofte scandal, Farum BK was re-branded as FC Nordsjælland, named after the North Zealand (Danish: Nordsjælland) region to clarify the club was to represent both the region as well as the town in which the club is based. To reinforce the status as a regional team, a network of local football clubs from the surrounding area was created, consisting of around 66 teams, with the aim to highlight young talent in the region and bring it to national attention via FC Nordsjælland. The network is known as Fodbold Samarbejde Nordsjælland (FSN).

The club's second year in the Superliga, first as Nordsjælland, struggled to improve on the previous year's outing. With its worst goal difference since turning professional, not one FCN player ended in the top ten goal scorers, fighting to avoid relegation for most of the season, ending the campaign in ninth place. The Wild Tiger fans, however, were rewarded with European football with the club's first appearance in the UEFA Cup; it beat Armenian team Shirak 6–0 on aggregate in the qualifying round, but were eliminated in the first round by Greek team Panionios. Christian Andersen was sacked at the end of the 2003–04 season, replaced by Johnny Petersen as head coach.

The following two years under Johnny Petersen were spent avoiding relegation, with no success to speak of in either the Superliga or Danish Cup. Petersen's reign was not completely amiss, as he was noted for creating a good young team and the emergence of players Mads Junker and Anders Due. For the 2006–07 season, Morten Wieghorst was promoted from assistant to head coach, a position the former Celtic player would retain for five years.

Wieghorst's first dilemma in charge of FCN was to fill the gap left by top scorer Mads Junker, sale to Dutch side Vitesse the previous winter. Morten Nordstrand came in on a free from nearby Lyngby after scoring 29 goals in the 1st Division that previous season. Nordstrand would go on to make an instant impact, topping the goal scorers charts for the first half of the 2006–07 season and earning himself a call up to the Denmark national team. Helping the club to a fifth-place finish, Nordstrand ended the season with 18 goals after appearing in every league match that season. Danish champions Copenhagen purchased the player at the end of the season for a then record 15 million Danish kroner, becoming the largest transfer fee ever paid for a player between two Danish clubs.

With lower-than-average attendance and issues still arising from the Brixtofte scandal, chairman Allan Kim Pedersen confirmed there had been discussions to move the club north to Hillerød, where it would be able expand to other sports such as ice hockey and basketball. The move, however, never materialized.

Nordsjælland would find itself in a similar position the following season, again having sold its star striker Martin Bernburg to Copenhagen. The team only managed a ninth-place finish, yet qualified for the UEFA Cup for the second time via the UEFA Respect Fair Play rankings. 2008–09 would become a good year for the Wild Tigers in terms of cup competitions, making it to the quarter-finals in the Danish Cup for the second time in its history, and improving on its previous European outing with wins over TVMK Tallinn and Queen of the South, though later being knocked out by Greek side Olympiacos 0–7 aggregate.

In October 2008, Allan K. Pedersen sold FC Nordsjælland from AKP Holding to himself for a reported 500,000 Danish kroner, shortly before his holding company went bankrupt, a price Pedersen, however, denies. Following an investigation from his creditors, it was found that the sale was forced through without the bank's consent, and that the value for which the club was sold was too low, which ultimate reduced the finances the creators received for the sale. FCN was reevaluated to be worth 35 million kroner at the time of sale. The case has gone to the Supreme Court and is yet to be resolved; it speculated that it could take one-to-four years.

The 2009–10 season saw Nordsjælland lift its first trophy, the Danish Cup. FCN was not drawn against another Superliga team until the quarter-final meeting with Silkeborg, where it won 3–1 in extra time. The team would go on to face Midtjylland in Nordsjælland's first cup final, winning in extra time 2–0 with goals from new signing Nicolai Stokholm and Bajram Fetai, and qualifying for European competition in the newly remodeled UEFA Europa League. The team would repeat this feat the following season, facing Midtjylland once again in the finals of the Danish Cup and winning the trophy for the second time with a 3–2 win. This would be Morten Wieghorst's last trophy with the Wild Tigers, however; he moved to manage the Denmark under-21 national team at the end of the 2010–11 campaign.

Kasper Hjulmand was named Wieghorst's successor in June 2011, promoted from the coaching staff. In preparation for the 2011–12 season, the former Lyngby head coach brought in two Danish internationals in Mikkel Beckmann (from relegated Randers) and Patrick Mtiliga (on a free from Málaga). FCN sought to improve on the previous season's sixth-place finish and to defend its Danish Cup title for the second year running. It would go on to play in the Europa League for second year in a row, exiting the competition in the third qualifying round after losing to Sporting CP 2–1 aggregate, which had also eliminated Nordsjælland from Europe the previous season.

FCN started the new season in good form, peaking as high as second in the Superliga, and an undefeated run at home in all competitions until 30 October, including an impressive 0–0 draw with Portuguese side Sporting CP, making the start of the 2011–12 campaign one of its best starts in recent years. For the first time in club history, a total of five players were called up to the Denmark national team to face Sweden and Finland in November: Mikkel Beckmann, Andreas Bjelland and debutantes Tobias Mikkelsen, Jesper Hansen and Jores Okore. FCN ended the season as Superliga champions for the first time in its history.

In 2012–13, for the first time FCN participated in the UEFA Champions League, where it was drawn into a difficult group alongside defending champions Chelsea, Serie A champions Juventus and Ukrainian Premier League champions Shakhtar Donetsk. FCN played all its home matches at the Danish national stadium, Parken. It gained one point from the group stage – playing 1–1 against Juventus at home thanks to a direct free-kick goal from Beckmann. In the last group match, a controversial goal from Luiz Adriano became the talking point of the match.

Players

Current squad

Out on loan

Retired numbers
26 –  Jonathan Richter (2005–09)

Overall most appearancesOverall top scorers

Former players

Club captains
Since 2001, seven players have held the position as club captain for Farum BK or FC Nordsjælland. The first recorded captain was Michael Elbæk. All recorded captains to date have been of Danish nationality. The captain to have lifted the most trophies for FCN is Nicolai Stokholm, who won the Danish Cup on two occasions. Stokholm is also the current and longest-serving captain, having taken over from Henrik Kildentoft when the former arrived at the club in 2009.

Stadium
Nordsjælland plays its home matches in Right to Dream Park, which has a capacity of 10,100 attendances (9,800 seated). The stadium is the first in Denmark with artificial turf.

Club officials

Administration

Chairmen: Trine Hesselund Hopp Møller
Financial director: Flemming Junggaard Skou
Administration management: Phil Radley
Commercial director: Hanne Rolighed
Sporting director: Jan Laursen
Technical director: Flemming Pedersen
Club director: Søren Kristensen
Media officer: Mette Andersen
FCN academy leader: Mikkel Hemmersam

Coaching and medical staff

Manager: Johannes Hoff Thorup
Assistant manager: Casper Røjkjær
Player coach: Michael Essien
Goalkeeping coach: Magnus Pondus Hansen
Trasitional coach: Lasse Stensgaard
Analyzers: Thor Herdal & Alan Arac
Physiotherapists: Joakim Dilling & Jonas Petersen
Doctor: Jesper Petersen
Head of Nutrition: Bruno Cirillo

Managerial history

Key
* Served as caretaker manager.
† Served as caretaker manager before being appointed permanently.

Honours

National tournaments
Danish Superliga
Champions: 2011–12
Runners up: 2012–13
1st Division
Runners up (1): 2001–02
Zealand Series
Runners up: 1996
Danish Cup
Winners: 2009–10, 2010–11

International tournaments

Friendly tournaments
La Manga Cup
Winners: 2012

Season results

FC Nordsjælland in European competition

FC Nordsjælland's first competitive European match was on 14 August 2003, in the 2003–04 UEFA Cup, beating Shirak F.C. 4–0 at home. In total, the club has participated in European competitions in seven different seasons, reaching as far as the Group stage of the 2012–13 UEFA Champions League. However, as of August 2018, they have never qualified for the group stage after starting from a qualifying round.

Fodbold Samarbejde Nordsjælland

The Fodbold Samarbejde Nordsjælland (Football Cooperation North Zealand or FSN in short) is a network of affiliated clubs headed by FC Nordsjælland, in which to highlight talent, youth development, cooperation and community in the North Zealand region. Where clubs participating receive benefits from FCN such as loan moves, friendlies, tickets to games, merchandise, coach visits, training camps and coaching courses. In return, FC Nordsjælland get access to a large scouting network of youth players, which has helped develop many young talent to become youth internationals, who have gone on to play professionally in the Danish Superliga and beyond. FSN has also played an important role in the attendance rise in Farum Park.

Affiliated clubs

 Allerød FK
 Alsønderup IF
 Ålholm Fodbold
 Ølsted IF
 Ølstykke FC
 Ballerup IF
 BFC Lundegården
 Blistrup SI
 Brødeskov IF
 Blovstrød IF
 BSV
 Dalby IF
 Dragør BK
 Døllefjelde Musse IF
 Elite 3000
 Espergærde IF
 FA 2000
 Farum BK
 Faxe Ladeplads IF
 FC Holte
 FC Jonstrup
 FIF Hillerød
 Frederikssund IK
 Frem Hellebæk
 G77 Gundsømagle
 Gilleleje FK
 Gørløse SI
 Grantoften IF
 Græsted IF
 Gundsølille IF
 Gundsømagle 77
 Gurre IK
 Hasle IF
 Hørsholm-Usserød IK
 Helsinge Fodbold
 Helsingør IF
 Hillerød GI
 Hornbæk IF
 Humlebæk BK
 Hundested IK
 IF Skjold Birkerød
 IS Skævinge
 Jyllinge FC
 Jægersborg BK
 Kalundborg GB
 Karlebo IF
 KBK Hillerød
 Kirke Hyllinge IF
 Kirke Værløse IF
 KFUM Roskilde
 Kr. Værløse IF
 Lolland-Falster Alliancen
 Lynge Uggeløse IF
 Måløv BK
 NB Bornholm
 Nordstevns GI
 Nødebo IF
 Nivå Kokkedal FK
 Oppe Sundby IF
 ORI Fodbold
 Raklev GI
 Ramløse Fodbold
 Skovshoved IF
 Slangerup og Omegns IF
 Slangslunde-Ganløse IF
 Snekkersten IF
 Store Lyngby IF
 Tikøb IF
 Uvelse IF
 Værløse BK
 Vejby-Tisvilde Fodbold

Footnotes and references

External links
Official website 
F.C. Nordsjælland at UEFA 

 
Nordsjaelland, F.C.
Association football clubs established in 1991
1991 establishments in Denmark
Farum